Philip M. Gschwend is an American engineer focusing on environmental organic chemistry, currently the Ford Professor of Civil and Environmental Engineering at the Massachusetts Institute of Technology.

References

Year of birth missing (living people)
Living people
MIT School of Engineering faculty
21st-century American engineers
California Institute of Technology alumni